Music education is considered an important section of the Indian education sector. However, it is a poor section of the education sector in India due to lack of interest by students. This affects different music genres to different degrees. For example, the classical music genre in particular lags behind due to the aforementioned reasons of low student interest.. Despite this Music schools can be a lucrative business in India. This is because they can be started with minimum investment and low risk. one of the Anurag dixit's musicology is also know as for music learning School in India Since 2003.

Universities and colleges

Notable universities and colleges of music in India are :
Anurag dixit's musicology – A renowned music institute in Noida
Prayag Sangeet Samiti, Allahabad
Indira Kala Sangeet University in Chhattisgarh
University of Calcutta which offers a faculty department in Music
University of Delhi – which offers a competitive post-graduation degree in music and a Doctor of Philosophy in Music.
University of Madras in Chennai
Visva-Bharati University in Santiniketan

See also
List of university and college schools of music
Music education
Music of India
Music school

References 

 
Music education in India